Félix Quero López (born 7 September 1982) is a Spanish footballer who plays as a forward for UD Llanera.

Club career
Born in Avilés, Asturias, Quero spent the vast majority of his professional career in his country's lower leagues, amassing Segunda División B totals of 284 matches and 26 goals in representation of UD Pájara Playas de Jandía, CD Leganés, AD Ceuta, Marino de Luanco, Real Unión, CD Lugo, UD Logroñés and Caudal Deportivo; he promoted to Segunda División with the fifth and sixth clubs, contributing to the feats with a total of 78 games and six goals.

Quero made his debut as a professional on 29 August 2009, starting in a 0–1 home loss against Recreativo de Huelva. He scored his first and only goal in the second level on 24 April 2010, the first one in an eventual 2–0 home win over Real Murcia as the Basques eventually suffered relegation.

In 2013, aged 31, Quero moved abroad for the first time in his career, signing for Club Jorge Wilstermann in Bolivia.

References

External links

1982 births
Living people
People from Avilés
Spanish footballers
Footballers from Asturias
Association football forwards
Segunda División players
Segunda División B players
Tercera División players
CD Leganés players
AD Ceuta footballers
Marino de Luanco footballers
Real Unión footballers
CD Lugo players
UD Logroñés players
Caudal Deportivo footballers
Bolivian Primera División players
C.D. Jorge Wilstermann players
Spanish expatriate footballers
Expatriate footballers in Bolivia
Spanish expatriate sportspeople in Bolivia